Michael Lawrence Estep (born December 29, 1963) is a former American football tackle who played for the Buffalo Bills and the Green Bay Packers of the National Football League (NFL). He played college football at Bowling Green University.

References 

1963 births
Living people
American football offensive tackles
Bowling Green Falcons football players
Buffalo Bills players
Green Bay Packers players